Nabadwip Ghat (popularly known as Swarupganj) is a village and former narrow gauge railway station in Nadia district in the Indian state of West Bengal. The village situated on the banks of the Bhagirathi River and just on the opposite side of the river is Nabadwip town.

Transport 
This was the terminal railway station of Shantipur-Nabadwip Ghat route Narrow-gauge railway tracks. At present the Narrow Gauge route is abandoned and Broad Gauge Tracks are laid till amghata railway station and not beyond it. Bus services are available towards Krishnagar from the locality. Nabadwip is connected through ferry service to Nabadwip ghat or Maheshganj.

References

Villages in Nadia district